Mahalaya is the last day of offering tribute to our departed forefathers, i. e pitripaksha and the beginning of the devipaksha. At the time of the cataclysm, when the earth became a great cause-sea, Lord Vishnu laid Anantanag on that sea and fell into a deep sleep. At this time, two demons named Madhu and Kaitabh came out of Vishnu's earlobe and tried to kill Brahma in Vishnu's navel. In order to awaken Vishnu, Brahma began to praise His eyesight. When God Shri Vishnu was awakened, He fought a great war with Madhu and Kaitabh for five thousand years .But only at last of the 5000 yrs Goddess Durga or Goddess Aadishakti helped God Vishnu to finish the two demons Madhu and Kaitabha and finally God Vishnu killed those two demons. Mahalaya is at the crossroads between the opposite side and the goddess side .

In the month of Bhadra, Krishna Pratipada begins and the time till the next new moon is called the opposite side. According to the Puranas, under the direction of Brahma, the patriarchs moved closer to these 15 days of human life. Therefore, if something is offered to them for this purpose, it will easily reach them.Therefore, for the whole fortnight, the patriarch is worshiped through remembrance and contemplation. This mahalaya is the final manifestation or mahalagna. Many people call this day the beginning of the goddess. Although this is a popular misconception. Last day is still for the patriarchy only .Only from the next day, the Goddess Durga's side begins at Shukla Pratipada. From that day till Kojagari full moon, 15 days are the goddess's side.

Matripaksha Introduction

Jago Dashpraharan Dharini  
Jago Durga, Jago Dashapraharan Dharini, Abhayashakti Bal Pradayani Tumi Jago-Devi Prasid Paripalay No Hari Bhite: Nityang Yathaasura vadhaadi dhanaiva Sadya: .With this holy call, Punya Tithi Mahalaya is celebrated all over the world. Akashvani will be broadcast from Kolkata by Mahishasuramardini Jagat Janani Devi Durga will be invoked in the composition and promotion of Bani Kumar by the immortal voice of mother Birendra Krishna Bhadra. Durgaayai Durgapaaraayai Saaraayai Sarvakaarinyai Khyaatyai Tathaiva Krishnaayai Dhumraayai Satatam Nama: - Holy Punyatithi Mahalaya at the call of Matrubandhana. Mahalaya will be celebrated in the mother's worship bond before the Durga Puja week of autumn.

Chandi Lessons 
In the scriptures, mahalaya is a date of the new moon, on which the shraddha of the ancestors is usually performed. On this day, the ancestors are freed from the torments of hell and give us blessings. Besides, Goddess Durga is awakened on the day of mahalaya, awakening is done by invoking the Goddess by reciting mantras. Therefore, after the mahalaya, the autumn Durga Puja is started by placing pots in the position of the goddess / white side. From Shravan to Pausha six months are of Dakshinayana, the sleeping period of the Dakshinayana deities. .So the gods are awakened by enlightenment. After the mahalaya, Durga Puja is organized by deciding the time of enlightenment. It is called Kalparambha, although the main activities of worship start from the sixth, hence it is called Shashthaadi kalparambha. And from the seventh to the idol. .From pratipada only Puja and Chandi lessons ( Chandi Paath ) take place.

References 

Indian mythology in popular culture